The Josiah Willard Gibbs Lectureship (also called the Gibbs Lecture) of the American Mathematical Society is an annually awarded mathematical prize, named in honor of Josiah Willard Gibbs. The prize is intended not only for mathematicians, but also for physicists, chemists, biologists, physicians, and other scientists who have made important applications of mathematics. The purpose of the prize is to recognize outstanding achievement in applied mathematics and "to enable the public and the academic community to become aware of the contribution that mathematics is making to present-day thinking and to modern civilization."

The prize winner gives a lecture, which is subsequently published in the Bulletin of the American Mathematical Society.

Prize winners

See also

 List of mathematics awards

References

External links 
 Official Website
 AMS Meetings – January 2015
 AMS Gibbs Lecturers, MacTutor

Awards of the American Mathematical Society
Awards established in 1923
1923 establishments in the United States
Lecture series